Cassville is an unincorporated community in Howard Township, Howard County, Indiana, United States. It is part of the Kokomo, Indiana Metropolitan Statistical Area.

History
Originally named Pleasant Spring, Cassville was renamed in 1854 for Lewis Cass, a U.S. Senator from Michigan.

Geography

Highway
 US-31 to South Bend (North) and Indianapolis (South)

References

Unincorporated communities in Howard County, Indiana
Kokomo, Indiana metropolitan area
Unincorporated communities in Indiana